is a Japanese actor and singer associated with Watanabe Entertainment. He is a member of the acting troupe D-Boys and the leader of its pop unit D-Date. As an actor, Araki has been involved in many theater and television projects, notably starring in Musical: The Prince of Tennis, Juken Sentai Gekiranger, and Musical: Touken Ranbu. In 2015, Araki made his solo debut with his single Next Stage.

Career
In October 2004, Araki joined the Watanabe Entertainment group named the D-Boys. On April 27, 2005, they have released a photobook entitled D-Boys, while the second, released on March 15, 2006, was called Start. Araki has appeared in various TV shows, debuting in the TV drama The Hit Parade as a member of The Tigers. The show, which aired on May 26, 2006 on Fuji TV, also starred his fellow D-Boys members Masato Wada, Yuu Shirota, Masaki Kaji, Hiroki Suzuki, Yuuya Endo and Kōji Seto. Araki also appeared on a Japanese radio program for BAY FM with fellow D-Boys member Kōji Seto on October 14, 2006.

Araki's acting career took off when he portrayed Sadaharu Inui, the "data-tennis" regular of Seigaku Middle School's tennis club in the Prince of Tennis musicals, Tennimu. He became the second actor to play Inui as part of the second-generation Seigaku cast. He made his debut on January 8, 2005 in the Side Yamabuki performance in Osaka. During his run in the musicals, he worked with fellow D-Boys members Yuya Endo, Kotaro Yanagi, Masaki Kaji, Hiroki Suzuki, Osamu Adachi, Masato Wada, and former member Yu Shirota. Araki reprised his role in the live-adaptation film of the Prince of Tennis manga series. He, along with most of the principal cast members for the Seigaku Regulars, reprised their roles in the movie, while Kanata Hongō was cast as Ryoma Echizen, the main protagonist. On March 29, 2006, at the end of the final Dream Live 3rd show, Araki and majority of the Seigaku cast graduated from their roles. After his graduation, he was succeeded by Masei Nakayama in portraying Inui.

The D-Boys starred in their own drama documentary variety series called, DD-Boys in which Araki has appeared in a few episodes as himself. The show has 24 episodes and ran from April 10 to September 25, 2006. Araki appeared in the film June Bride based on the manga of the same name by Yoshida Satoshi. He played one of the supporting characters and co-starred with fellow D-Boys members Shirota and Suzuki.

In June 2006, Araki acted onstage in the play Limit: What Is Your Story?, where he appeared with fellow D-Boys members Suzuki and Yuichi Nakamura. On February 18, 2007, Araki starred in the Super Sentai series Juken Sentai Gekiranger as the main villain Rio, a former student of the Gekijuken Beast Arts whose motivation of becoming strong resulted in him turning his back on his teacher as he becomes leader of the revived Rinjuken Akugata. The show also co-stars Hirofumi's fellow D-Boys member Suzuki as Rio's rival and the series protagonist, Jan Kandō/GekiRed.

It was announced in early 2007 that Araki, along with D-Boys members Suzuki and Kōji Seto would be getting solo photobooks and DVDs called the "Prince Series". Araki's solo photobook was released on April 19, 2007, while his solo idol DVD was released on May 16, 2007. A "Prince Series" trading card set featuring all three boys shortly followed the release of the books and DVDs. In June 2007, the D-Boys starred in their very own musical together called, D-Boys Stage, which ran from June 3 to 10 at the Space Zero theater in Tokyo. Araki appeared in the musical as a guest performer, making select appearances on June 6 and 9.

Araki's second photobook, entitled "Always By Your Side" was released in May 2008. It was brought out simultaneously with Suzuki's second photobook despite being separate from the "Prince Series", most likely to highlight on the boys' success in Juken Sentai Gekiranger. A limited-edition trading card set featuring both Araki and Suzuki was released on September 27, 2008 to coincide with their recent books.

Personal life
Araki keeps a blog on his D-Boys webpage, which he updates frequently. He is very close friends with fellow D-Boys members Hiroki Suzuki, Kōji Seto, Masaki Kaji, Masato Wada, and Osamu Adachi.

Filmography

Film

Television

TV animation

Stage

Official DVDs

Notes

References

External links
 Hirofumi Araki on Avex 
 Hirofumi Araki on Watanabe Entertainment 
 
 
 
 
 Hirofumi Araki's official blog
 D-Boys Official website 
 D-Date Official website 

1983 births
Living people
Japanese male stage actors
Actors from Hyōgo Prefecture
Musicians from Hyōgo Prefecture
21st-century Japanese singers
21st-century Japanese male singers